Events in the year 2010 in Slovakia.

Incumbents 
 President – Ivan Gašparovič 
 Prime Minister – Robert Fico, Iveta Radičová
 Speaker of the National Council – Pavol Paška, Richard Sulík

Events
12 June – Parliamentary election
30 August – The 2010 Bratislava shooting
18 September – Slovak political reform referendum, 2010

Notable deaths
9 September – Peter Dzúrik, football player (born 1968)
25 September – Zoltán Pálkovács, judoka (born 1981).

References

 
2010s in Slovakia
Slovakia
Slovakia
Years of the 21st century in Slovakia